Living in a Moment is the second studio album by American country music artist Ty Herndon. The album was released in 1996 (see 1996 in country music) via Epic Records. Like his debut album What Mattered Most, the album has been certified gold by the RIAA. It features the singles "Living in a Moment", "She Wants to Be Wanted Again", "Loved Too Much" and "I Have to Surrender".

The video for Living in a Moment was filmed at Sunset Station in San Antonio, Texas. The depot was owned by VIA Metropolitan Transit and was, at the time, a stopping point for Amtrak.

Content
Living in a Moment is led off by its title track, which is also the first single release from it. This song became Herndon's second Number One hit on the Billboard country singles charts in 1996. Following this song were the #21 "She Wants to Be Wanted Again", the #2 "Loved Too Much" and the #17 "I Have to Surrender".

Four of this album's songs have also been recorded by other artists. "She Wants to Be Wanted Again" was originally recorded by Larry Stewart on his 1994 album Heart Like a Hurricane, and later by Western Flyer on their 1996 album Back in America. "I Know How the River Feels" was later released in 1999 as a single by Diamond Rio from their 1998 album Unbelievable, and again by McAlyster in 2000. In addition, Gary Allan recorded "Don't Tell Mama" on his 1999 album Smoke Rings in the Dark, as did Doug Stone on his 2007 album My Turn. Stone's version was a single in 2008. Kevin Sharp recorded "Her Heart Is Only Human" on his 1998 album Love Is. Frankie Ballard recorded and under the title "Don't Tell Mama I Was Drinking" on his 2014 album Sunshine & Whiskey.

Doug Virden and Drew Womack, members of the band Sons of the Desert at the time, provided background vocals on this album, as did Blue Miller, formerly of the Silver Bullet Band and Gibson/Miller Band. Both the Gibson/Miller Band and Sons of the Desert recorded for Epic as well.

Track listing

Personnel
Bruce Bouton - pedal steel guitar, lap steel guitar
Joe Chemay - bass guitar
Larry Franklin - fiddle
Ty Herndon - lead vocals
Dann Huff - electric guitar
Paul Leim - drums
Steve Nathan - keyboards
Tom Roady - percussion
Brent Rowan - electric guitar
Biff Watson - acoustic guitar, mandolin
John Willis - electric guitar

Background vocalists
Stephanie Bentley
Mike Jones
Liana Manis
Blue Miller
Jonell Mosser
John Wesley Ryles
Doug Virden
Drew Womack

Chart performance

References
Allmusic (see infobox)

1996 albums
Epic Records albums
Ty Herndon albums
Albums produced by Doug Johnson (record producer)